Foreigners is a 1972 Swedish drama film directed by Johan Bergenstråhle.  Bergenstråhle won the award for Best Director at the 9th Guldbagge Awards. The working title of the film was Kocksgatan 48.

Cast
 Maria Antipa as Maria
 Andreas Bellis as Dimitris
 Edith Jansson as Housewife
 Mårten Larsson as Chef
 Harriette Lindered as Waitress
 Gisela Louhimo as Waitress
 Anastasios Margetis as Tomas
 Helena Olofsson-Carmback (as Helena Olofsson)
 Konstantinos Papageorgiou as Stelios
 Despina Tomazani as Despina
 Savas Tzanetakis as Kostas

References

External links
 
 

1972 films
1972 drama films
Swedish drama films
1970s Swedish-language films
Films directed by Johan Bergenstråhle
Films whose director won the Best Director Guldbagge Award
1970s Swedish films